Jesper Mølgaard Kristensen (born 16 September 1986) is a former Danish professional football midfielder, who played 52 matches for Lyngby BK including 13 matches in the Danish Superliga.

References

External links
Lyngby BK profile
Career statistics at Danmarks Radio

1986 births
Living people
Danish men's footballers
Boldklubben af 1893 players
Lyngby Boldklub players
Brønshøj Boldklub players
Danish Superliga players

Association football midfielders